The Truth About Women is a 1957 British comedy film directed by Muriel Box and starring Laurence Harvey, Julie Harris, Mai Zetterling and Diane Cilento.

Plot
When his son-in-law comes to him with a woeful tale of an unhappy relationship and a belief that all women are impossible to love, elderly Sir Humphrey Tavistock calmly puts him straight.

Tavistock regales him with decades-old anecdotes of found lovers and lost love. We meet in flashback the free-thinking Ambrosine Viney, an independent woman ahead of her time, and the sophisticated Louise Tiere, a diplomat's wife. There are others as well, including one whom Tavistock adores and marries, only to lose her forever during childbirth.

Cast
 Laurence Harvey as Sir Humphrey Tavistock
 Julie Harris as Helen Cooper
 Diane Cilento as Ambrosine Viney
 Mai Zetterling as Julie
 Eva Gabor as Louise
 Michael Denison as Rollo
 Derek Farr as Anthony
 Elina Labourdette as Comtesse
 Roland Culver as Charles Tavistock
 Wilfrid Hyde-White as Sir George Tavistock
 Marius Goring as Otto Kerstein
 Robert Rietti as the Sultan
 Catherine Boyle (Katie Boyle) as Diana
 Ambrosine Phillpotts as Lady Tavistock
 Jocelyn Lane as Saida (billed as Jackie Lane)
 Lisa Gastoni as Mary Maguire
 Hal Osmond as Baker

Critical reception
TV Guide: "the direction is simply too serious for what should have been a much lighter comedy, so the film falls far short of its intentions". The New York Times: "an erratic but basically good-natured color pacing written, directed and produced by Muriel and Sydney Box. With Laurence Harvey heading a large, impressive cast...Visually, the picture is luscious. The five episodes that carry the well-born hero from young manhood to the fireside spread out over beautifully tinted, lavish period and modern settings. The small army of ladies engulfing the poor bloke have been dressed to kill by an expert, Cecil Beaton. Smoothly, deviously and knowingly the picture slides along as if a good joke were tucked up one of the Beaton sleeves...As an uncomplicated young painter who marries him and eventually dies in childbirth, our own American Miss Harris is splendid, far and away the best and least glittering thing in the picture. Her meeting with Mr. Harvey, in a stranded elevator, is a gem of a scene. The last section, as Mr. Harvey almost attains happiness with a wise, unselfish nurse, movingly played by Miss Zetterling, slides appropriately into a bittersweet but lighthearted fade-out.
Of the large cast, such people as Michael Denison, Derek Farr, Marius Goring, Roland Culver and Wilfred Hyde-White bolster the opulent tapestry with effective bits. As for why it should take an intelligent, red-blooded Englishman more than fifty years to discover the "truth," as Mr. Harvey finally states it, we thought they learned that at Eton."

References

1957 films
1957 comedy films
Films directed by Muriel Box
British comedy films
Films with screenplays by Muriel Box
Films with screenplays by Sydney Box
Films produced by Sydney Box
1950s English-language films
1950s British films